The girls' 1000 metres in short track speed skating at the 2016 Winter Youth Olympics was held on 14 February at the Gjøvik Olympic Cavern Hall.

Results 
 QAB – qualified for the semifinals A/B
 QC – qualified for Final C
 PEN – penalty
 ADA – advanced

Quarterfinals

Semifinals

Semifinals A/B 
 QA – qualified for Final A
 QB – qualified for Final B

Finals

Final C

Final B

Final A

References 

Girls' 1000m